Malek Baayou  (born 29 April 1999 in Sousse), also spelled Malek Beaoui, is a Tunisian professional footballer who plays as a midfielder for Étoile Sportive du Sahel and the Tunisia national team.

Club career
Baayou is trained at the Étoile Sportive du Sahel (ESS), where he goes through all categories of young people.
 
In 2019, Malek Baayou has decided to renew his contract with ES Sahel. He signed a four-year contract.

In January 2019, he was voted best player of the month in Tunisian League.

He participates with the same club in the CAF Champions League, the CAF Confederation Cup and the CAF Supercup.

International career
Malek Baayou played his first match for the Tunisian national football team on September 21, 2019, in a friendly against Libya. This match won 1-0 is part of the qualifiers for the 2020 African Nations Championship.

Honours and Achievements

Étoile sportive du Sahel 
Tunisian Cup : 2018-19
Arab Club Champions Cup : 2018-19

References

External links

1999 births
Living people
People from Sousse
Association football midfielders
Tunisian footballers
Étoile Sportive du Sahel players
Tunisian Ligue Professionnelle 1 players
Tunisia international footballers